The School of Health Professions is a public magnet high school in Dallas, Texas, United States. It is housed in the Yvonne A. Ewell Townview Magnet Center and is part of the Dallas Independent School District.

There are several clusters within the school, including Medical Laboratory Practicum, Clinical Medical Assisting/Billing & Coding, Exercise Science/Sports Medicine, dental laboratory technology, Patient Care Technician. Membership in the Health Occupations Students of America is encouraged where students can compete and gain leadership roles. , as well as through the National Honor Society, among many others. In 2012, it was ranked as fourth out of the top ten high schools in the North Texas area by Children at Risk, a research and advocacy institute dedicated to helping children.

References 

Dallas Independent School District high schools
Public high schools in Dallas
Public magnet schools in Dallas